Jennifer Biesty is a chef and restaurateur (Shakewell+Oakland) who appeared on Top Chef: Chicago where she competed against her girlfriend Zoi Antonitsas.

Biography
Biesty is a native of Brooklyn, New York. She studied at The Culinary Institute of America (CIA) and was one of their youngest students. She interned in New Orleans at the Sazerac.

Career
After graduating from CIA, Biesty went to Manhattan to work with Marcus Samuelsson at Restaurant Aquavit. She then went to work with Loretta Keller in San Francisco and spent time in Europe working with various chefs.

After competing on Top Chef, Biesty was executive chef at Scala’s Bistro in the Sir Francis Drake Hotel.

Biesty also competed to Beat Bobby Flay  and won on Chopped.

References

External links
Shakewell website

Living people
Chefs from New York City
American women chefs
LGBT chefs
Culinary Institute of America Hyde Park alumni
Reality cooking competition contestants
Top Chef contestants
Reality cooking competition winners
People from Brooklyn
American women restaurateurs
American restaurateurs
Year of birth missing (living people)